Charles Walter Page (2 March 1917 – 13 October 2010) was an Australian rules footballer who played with Footscray in the Victorian Football League (VFL).

Page grew up in Newport and played for Spotswood United before joining Footscray. He kicked three goals on his Footscray debut in 1938, his only game of the year. In both 1939 and 1940, Page topped Footscray's goal-kicking, with 31 and 52 goals respectively. He kicked nine goals against Richmond in the opening round of the 1940 VFL season, which remained his personal best. His career ended prematurely due to the war.

References

External links
 

1917 births
2010 deaths
Australian rules footballers from Melbourne
Western Bulldogs players
Australian military personnel of World War II
People from Newport, Victoria
Military personnel from Melbourne